1953 was the 54th season of County Championship cricket in England. There was a tight Test series between England and Australia that was settled, after four drawn matches, in the final Test at The Oval, where England won to reclaim The Ashes for the first time since the Bodyline series of 1932–33. The County Championship was won by Surrey for the second consecutive season.

Honours
County Championship – Surrey
Minor Counties Championship – Berkshire
Wisden (honour awarded in 1954 Wisden Cricketer's Almanack for deeds done in 1953 English season) – Neil Harvey, Tony Lock, Keith Miller, Johnny Wardle, Willie Watson

County Championship

Test series

Leading batsmen

Leading bowlers

References

Annual reviews
 Playfair Cricket Annual 1954
 Wisden Cricketers' Almanack 1954

Further reading
 Bill Frindall, The Wisden Book of Test Cricket 1877-1978, Wisden, 1979
 Chris Harte, A History of Australian Cricket, Andre Deutsch, 1993
 Ray Robinson, On Top Down Under, Cassell, 1975

External links
 CricketArchive – season summary

1953 in English cricket
English cricket seasons in the 20th century